Albert Bourne (1863–1930) was an English footballer who played for Stoke.

Career
Bourne played in the local church league before joining Stoke in 1888. He was a member of Stoke's reserve side the 'Swifts' and was overlooked by manager Harry Lockett for the first team. His only senior appearance came in the FA Cup against Warwick County. Stoke lost and most of the reserve players including Bourne were released. He later went on to play for Tunstall Rovers.

Career statistics

References

English footballers
Stoke City F.C. players
1862 births
1930 deaths
Association football fullbacks